Abdollahabad (also romanized as ‘Abdollāhābād; also known as ‘Abdollahābād-e Hūmeh and Abdollah Abad Hoomeh) is a village in Jahadabad Rural District, in the Central District of Anbarabad County, Kerman Province, Iran. At the 2006 census, its population was 148, in 34 families.

References 

Populated places in Anbarabad County